The Siberian sculpin (Cottus sibiricus) is a species of freshwater ray-finned fish belonging to the family Cottidae, the typical sculpins.. It is found in Siberian river basins of the Arctic Ocean from the Ob to Yana rivers. It reaches a maximum length of 15.0 cm

References

Cottus (fish)
Fish described in 1889
Taxa named by Karl Kessler